Duncan MacLeod Riddell (born 26 September 1993) is an international field hockey player who plays as a midfielder for Scotland and plays club hockey in the Men's England Hockey League for Reading Hockey Club.

In August 2019, he was selected in the Scotland squad for the 2019 EuroHockey Championship.

References

External links

1993 births
Living people
Sportspeople from Edinburgh
Male field hockey midfielders
Scottish male field hockey players
Reading Hockey Club players
Men's England Hockey League players